, usually stylized as OutRun2, is a 2003 racing game released by Sega for the arcades.

Gameplay
OutRun 2 stays true to the race format from the 1986 original, in which the player is behind the steering wheel of a Ferrari sports car with a friend in the passenger seat through 5 of 15 stages. As before, the player can choose their course and the soundtrack.

Sega licensed seven Ferrari vehicles for OutRun 2, including the Testarossa from the original game.

As with the previous games, OutRun 2's racing isn't realistic. Drifting is emphasized to control the cars through turns.

The soundtrack was completely rearranged, bringing in seven pieces of music with styles ranging from instrumental rock to upbeat ballads. The original 1986 music is also unlockable.

OutRun 2 has been overhauled with 3D graphics and a local networked multiplayer system.

Single-player game modes

OutRun 2 provides three single-player game modes: "OutRun mode", "Heart Attack mode" and "Time Attack mode":

Outrun Race – the player drives through 5 of 15 stages, selecting the next course via forks on the road. There is a time limit which is extended when the player passes through checkpoints.
Heart Attack Mode – the player drives the open-ended course to a time limit (as in OutRun Race), and the passenger will frequently request certain stunts and actions. These requests, carried out through marked sections of the course, can include passing traffic cars, drifting around bends, driving through marked lanes, knocking over cones, and simply not crashing into anything for as long as possible. If the player is successful, they will receive heart points and, at the end of the request section, will be graded according to their performance. At the end of the stage, the player will receive an average grade based on performance during previous stunts. Crashing into the scenery or driving off-road at any time will result in the player losing hearts. Should the player reach a goal with a satisfying grade and within the time limit, they will receive a more romantic ending.
Time Attack Mode – the player races a 'ghost' car over a pre-selected course to the time limit. Time checks are presented to the player at various points on each stage.

All unlockable bonus secret tracks are from Scud Race and Daytona USA 2 on the Xbox version.

Cars
 Novice class (Acceleration – 8; Handling – 8; Top Speed – 6)
 Dino 246 GTS
 365 GTS/4 Daytona
 Intermediate class (Acceleration – 6; Handling – 8; Top Speed – 8)
 F50
 360 Spider
 Intermediate class (Acceleration – 10; Handling – 6; Top Speed – 6)
 Testarossa
 288 GTO
 F355 Spider (Xbox version only)
 328 GTS (Xbox version only)
 Professional class (Acceleration – 6; Handling – 6; Top Speed – 10)
 F40
 Enzo Ferrari
 250 GTO (Xbox version only)
 512 BB (Xbox version only)

Courses
Just like the original, the courses are laid out in the branching triangle format.
Most of these courses have fairly obvious old world themed environments.

Development
Developing the game precipitated some changes for its developers, Sega AM2, who had historically written their games using Unix systems. Writing for an Xbox-based system meant they had to adapt to the Microsoft Windows kernel.

List of music tracks
Bold tracks indicate console-only appearances:
 Splash Wave (Euro Remix and 1986 original)
 Magical Sound Shower (Euro Remix and 1986 original)
 Passing Breeze (Euro Remix and 1986 original)
 Risky Ride (Guitar Mix)
 Shiny World (Prototype Remix)
 Night Flight (Prototype and Instrumental mix)
 Life Was a Bore (Instrumental Mix)

Versions

OutRun 2 SP
In 2004, Sega released an upgrade to the OutRun 2 arcade game, titled OutRun 2 SP. The upgrade added 15 all-new courses which are predominantly based around a New World theme.

OutRun 2 SPs new courses, songs and game elements now appear (alongside the originals and new content) in the home video-game OutRun 2006: Coast 2 Coast.

New courses

Outrun 2SP

OutRun 2 SP DX/SDX 

An update entitled OutRun 2 SP SDX was shown at a privately held Sega show on July 7, 2006. This updated version of OutRun 2 does not run on the Sega Chihiro, but rather the Sega Lindbergh. This iteration is displayed at a resolution of 800*480 rather than the previous versions' 640*480 and features cooperative play involving both players sitting next to each other in replica Ferraris, taking turns driving the same car with their own set of controls. The 2-Player cabinet is designated as DX (Deluxe), and the 4-Player cabinet is designated as SDX (Super Deluxe), with raceview cameras on the players, and a live leaderboard over the center units.

Xbox version
In 2004, OutRun 2 was released on the Xbox. The task of coding shared by Sega AM2 and UK-based developers Sumo Digital. They succeeded in doing so, with a European release on October 1, followed by the U.S. release on October 25.

The Xbox version preserves the look and feel of the arcade original, but with the additions of 480p anamorphic widescreen support and tweaks to make it more suitable for home play. The arcade game was imported to provide a game type named simply "OutRun Arcade". This joins two other game types: OutRun Challenge, which includes 101 'missions' distributed over the 15 stages; and OutRun Xbox Live. The Tracks from Scud Race and Daytona USA 2 can be unlocked as a bonus.

In addition, some content from the arcade game is locked away alongside new, unique content, such as extra cars, extra music tracks, and even the original Out Run game itself. This content is unlocked as the player completes the OutRun Challenge missions. Some slight changes were made to the Arcade version such as the 3D model for the newer Testarossa Spider being replaced with a customised Testarossa from 1984. The Japanese version of the game was slightly altered further, fixing some glitches and altering the bonus stages. Another difference is the character Holly wears an all-new costume this time and the character Clarissa wears her original costume from the Japanese arcade version (basically the same except it is more revealing than the costume used for the western versions). Jennifer and Alberto are the only ones who did not wear different costumes. A Limited Edition Sleeve Version and a Limited Soundtrack Edition was released in PAL territories.

In June 2007 this game was added to the Xbox 360 backward compatibility list.

Reception

The Xbox version received "favorable" reviews according to video game review aggregator Metacritic.

References

External links
 
 

2003 video games
Arcade video games
Cancelled GameCube games
Cancelled PlayStation 2 games
Microsoft games
OutRun
Sega-AM2 games
Sega arcade games
Video game sequels
Video games developed in Japan
Video games developed in the United Kingdom
Video games scored by Hiroshi Kawaguchi
Video games scored by Richard Jacques
Xbox games
Multiplayer and single-player video games
Sumo Digital games